John Rae (20 November 1917 – 20 November 1917), sometimes misidentifed as James or Jim Rae, was a Scottish footballer who played as a left back for Rutherglen, Third Lanark (two spells, winning the Scottish Cup in 1889 in the first), Sunderland Albion and Scotland (gaining two caps between 1889 and 1890).

References

Sources

1862 births
1917 deaths
Sportspeople from Rutherglen
Scottish footballers
Scotland international footballers
Thistle F.C. players
Third Lanark A.C. players
Scottish Football League players
Football Alliance players
Sunderland Albion F.C. players
Association football fullbacks
Footballers from South Lanarkshire